Franz F. Planer, A.S.C. (29 March 1894 as František Plánička – 10 January 1963) was an Austrian-born cinematographer born in Karlsbad, Austria-Hungary (now Czech Republic).

Biography
The Planer family was very influential, and owned large tracts of farmland, businesses, libraries, and shops in Austria-Hungary, and several properties in and around Vienna, some of which were stolen by certain low ranking officers for their own families' use in the mid to late 1930s, using falsely issued papers and threats.

Planer had trained as a portrait painter, but realizing that photography was becoming very popular, and would replace the requirement for talented artists changed his career path. He changed direction into films, and thus began his career as a director of photography for films in Germany and later throughout Europe in the early 1900s until 1933,

In 1937, he left the failing Austrian film industry, to begin work in Hollywood. He shot over 130 movies, including Letter from an Unknown Woman (1948), The Big Country (1958) and Breakfast at Tiffany's (1961).

Partial filmography

 The War of the Oxen (1920)
 The Monastery's Hunter (1920)
 Storms in May (1920)
 The Fountain of Madness (1921)
 Night of the Burglar (1921)
 The Drums of Asia (1921)
 Monna Vanna (1922)
 The Favourite of the Queen (1922)
 Trutzi from Trutzberg (1922)
 Destiny (1925)
 Love's Finale (1925)
 Darling, Count the Cash (1926)
 Her Husband's Wife (1926)
 Tea Time in the Ackerstrasse (1926)
 Only a Dancing Girl (1926)
 The Son of Hannibal (1926)
 How Do I Marry the Boss? (1927)
 The Eighteen Year Old (1927)
 Queen of the Boulevards (1927)
 The Bordello in Rio (1927)
 Break-in (1927)
 Volga Volga (1928)
 The Duty to Remain Silent (1928)
 Strauss Is Playing Today (1928)
 The Green Alley (1928)
 Women on the Edge (1929)
 The Love of the Brothers Rott (1929)
 Hans in Every Street (1930)
 Retreat on the Rhine (1930)
 The Road to Paradise (1930)
 The Son of the White Mountain (1930)
 Calais-Dover (1931)
 The Office Manager (1931)
 No More Love (1931)
 The Prince of Arcadia (1932)
 The First Right of the Child (1932)
 The Countess of Monte Cristo (1932)
 The Black Hussar (1932)
 Sailor's Song (1932)
 Gently My Songs Entreat (1933)
 A City Upside Down (1933)
 The Hymn of Leuthen (1933)
 Unfinished Symphony (1934)
 Maskerade (1934)
 Moscow Nights (1934)
 So Ended a Great Love (1934)
 The Typist Gets Married (1934)
 Turn of the Tide (1935)
 The Divine Spark (1935)
 Thank You, Madame (1936)
  The Beloved Vagabond (1936)
 Harvest (1936)
 Flowers from Nice (1936)
 Such Great Foolishness (1937)
 Capers (1937)
 The Charm of La Boheme (1937)
 Premiere (1937)
 Holiday (1938)
 Glamour for Sale (1940)
 The Face Behind the Mask (1941)
 Our Wife (1941)
 Daring Young Man (1942)
 Appointment in Berlin (1943)
 My Kingdom for a Cook (1943)
 Secret Command (1944)
 I Love a Bandleader (1945)
 Her Sister's Secret (1946)
 The Chase (1946)
 One Touch of Venus (1948)
 Letter from an Unknown Woman (1948)
 Champion (1949)
 Criss Cross (1949)
 Illegal Entry (1949)
 Take One False Step (1949)
 Cyrano de Bergerac (1950)
 The Blue Veil (1951)
 The 5,000 Fingers of Dr. T (1953)
 The Caine Mutiny (1954)
 20,000 Leagues Under the Sea (1954)
 Not as a Stranger (1955)
 The Pride and the Passion (1957)
 The Big Country (1958)
 King of Kings (1961)
 Breakfast at Tiffany's (1961)
 The Children's Hour (1961)
 Something's Got to Give (1962, unfinished, restarted a year later as Move Over, Darling, with a different cast and technical staff)

Academy Award Nominations
Nominated for Cinematography (Black & White) 1949: Champion
Nominated for Cinematography (Black & White) 1951: Death of a Salesman
Nominated for Cinematography (Black & White) 1953: Roman Holiday
Nominated for Cinematography (Color) 1959: The Nun's Story
Nominated for Cinematography (Black & White) 1961: The Children's Hour

References
 Robert Müller: ¨Alpträume in Hollywood. Franz Planer: Eine Karriere zwischen Berlin, Wien und Los Angeles¨ in Christian Cargnelli, Michael Omasta (eds.): Schatten. Exil. Europäische Emigranten im Film noir (Vienna: PVS, 1997)

See also
 List of German-speaking Academy Award winners and nominees

1894 births
1963 deaths
American cinematographers
Austrian cinematographers
Austrian emigrants to the United States